Fred Harald Nomme (born 21 February 1946) is a Norwegian diplomat.

He was born in Sandefjord, and studied business administration at the University of Minnesota and San Francisco State College. He had a varied career outside of the diplomacy; he has worked at the University of Bergen, University of Oslo, Norwegian Shipowners' Association and as Private Secretary to Her Royal Highness the Crown Princess of Norway (currently Queen Sonja). From 1991 to 1994 he was a section leader in the Lillehammer Olympic Organising Committee, and during the 1994 Winter Olympics itself he was Chief of Protocol for the Games. 

Before becoming an ambassador, he had varied positions as diplomat in Norwegian embassies in Saudi Arabia, Morocco, France and the United States.

In 1995 he was appointed as Norway's ambassador to Nigeria. Since September 1995 he was also the ambassador to Benin, Togo, Ghana and Cameroon. Already in November 1995 he was recalled from Nigeria, following the execution of Ken Saro-Wiwa and the Ogoni Nine. He returned to Nigeria in 1996. In September 1998 Nomme moved on to become ambassador in Malaysia. From the next year he doubled as ambassador to Brunei as well. In 2005 he was named Consul General in Shanghai, PR China, and in November 2010 he became Norway's ambassador to Morocco.  He retired from the Norwegian Foreign Service in 2014.

In 2000 he was decorated as Commander of the Royal Norwegian Order of Merit.

References

1946 births
Living people
Carlson School of Management alumni
People from Sandefjord
Ambassadors of Norway to Nigeria
Ambassadors of Norway to Benin
Ambassadors of Norway to Togo
Ambassadors of Norway to Ghana
Ambassadors of Norway to Cameroon
Ambassadors of Norway to Malaysia
Ambassadors of Norway to Brunei
Ambassadors of Norway to Morocco
Norwegian expatriates in the United States
Norwegian expatriates in Saudi Arabia
Norwegian expatriates in France
Norwegian expatriates in China